The Fight of the Century or the Johnson–Jeffries Prize Fight was a boxing match between the first African American World Heavyweight Champion of Boxing Jack Johnson and the previously undefeated World Heavyweight Champion James J. Jeffries on July 4, 1910, US Independence Day. It was highly significant in the history of race relations in the U.S., and led to the Johnson–Jeffries riots in which more than 20 people died.

It was one of the most eagerly anticipated boxing matches of all time, with betting odds significantly favoring Jeffries, who had come back from retirement for the fight. The lead-up to the bout was peppered with racist press against Johnson; author Jack London described Jeffries two days before the fight as "the chosen representative of the white race, and this time the greatest of them", whilst a New York Times editorial wrote: "If the black man wins, thousands and thousands of his ignorant brothers will misinterpret his victory as justifying claims to much more than mere physical equality with their white neighbors."

Johnson beat Jeffries in the fifteenth round, approximately one hour after the fight began at  PST. Jeffries—who boasted that he had never been knocked down in a fight—fell three times to Johnson's punches, and was being counted out when his manager called the fight. Race riots broke out across the country over the following week—the first truly nationwide race riots in the United States.

A crowd of 18,020 attended in a stadium built for the fight, and telegraphed reports were followed across the nation.  Johnson and Jeffries both made over $100,000 from the purse, bonuses, and the sale of film rights. The film – The Johnson–Jeffries Fight – received more public attention in the United States than any other film to date and for the next five years, until the release of The Birth of a Nation, and was subsequently censored in many states and cities – the first movement for racist film censorship in history.

Background

In 1910, former undefeated heavyweight champion James J. Jeffries, came out of retirement to challenge Johnson, saying "I am going into this fight for the sole purpose of proving that a white man is better than a Negro". Efforts to persuade Jeffries to "retrieve the honor of the white race" began immediately after the Tommy Burns–Johnson fight. Initially Jeffries had no interest in the fight, being quite happy as an alfalfa farmer. However, on October 29, 1909, Johnson and Jeffries signed an agreement to "box for the heavyweight championship of the world" and called promoters to bid for the right to orchestrate the event. 

In early December 1909, Johnson and Jeffries selected a bid from the nation's top boxing promoters—Tex Rickard and John Gleason. The bid guaranteed a purse of $101,000 to be divided 75% to the winner and 25% to the loser, as well as two-thirds of the revenues collected from the sales of the right to film the fight (each boxer received one third of the equity rights). Although it was well understood that a victory for Jeffries was likely to be more profitable than a victory for Johnson, there were no doubts that the event would produce record profits. Legal historian Barak Orbach argues that in "an industry that promoted events through the dramatization of rivalries, a championship contest between an iconic representative of the white race and the most notorious [black fighter] was a gold mine." Jeffries mostly remained hidden from media attention until the day of the fight, while Johnson soaked up the spotlight. John L. Sullivan, who made boxing championships a popular and esteemed spectacle, stated that Johnson was in such good physical shape compared to Jeffries that he would only lose if he had a lack of skill on the day of the fight. Before the fight, Jeffries remarked, "It is my intention to go right after my opponent and knock him out as soon as possible." His wife added, "I'm not interested in prizefighting but I am interested in my husband's welfare, I do hope this will be his last fight." Johnson's words were "May the best man win."

Racial tension was brewing in the lead-up to the fight and in order to prevent any harm from coming to either boxer, guns were prohibited within the arena along with the sale of alcohol and anyone who was under the effects of alcohol. Apples were also banned as well as any weapon whatsoever. Behind the racial attitudes which were being instigated by the media was a major investment in gambling for the fight, with 10–7 odds in favor of Jeffries. The lead-up to the bout was peppered with racist press against Johnson; American author Jack London described Jeffries two days before the fight as "the chosen representative of the white race, and this time the greatest of them", whilst a New York Times editorial wrote: "If the black man wins, thousands and thousands of his ignorant brothers will misinterpret his victory as justifying claims to much more than mere physical equality with their white neighbors."

The fight

The fight took place on July 4, 1910, in front of nearly 20,000 people, at a ring which was built just for the occasion in downtown Reno, Nevada. Jeffries proved unable to impose his will on the younger champion and Johnson dominated the fight. By the 15th round, after Jeffries had been knocked down twice for the first time in his career, Jeffries's corner threw in the towel to end the fight and prevent Jeffries from having a knockout on his record.

Johnson later remarked he knew the fight was over in the 4th round when he landed an uppercut and saw the look on Jeffries's face, stating, "I knew what that look meant. The old ship was sinking." Afterwards, Jeffries was humbled by the loss and what he had seen of Johnson in their match. "I could never have whipped Johnson at my best", Jeffries said. "I couldn't have hit him. No, I couldn't have reached him in 1,000 years."

The "Fight of the Century" earned Johnson $65,000 (over $ million in  dollars) and silenced the critics, who had belittled Johnson's previous victory over Tommy Burns as "empty", claiming that Burns was a false champion since Jeffries had retired undefeated. John L. Sullivan commented after the fight that Johnson won deservedly, fairly, and convincingly:

Riots and aftermath

The outcome of the fight triggered race riots that evening—the Fourth of July—all across the United States, from Texas and Colorado to New York and Washington, D.C., Johnson's victory over Jeffries had dashed white dreams of finding a "great white hope" to defeat him. Many whites felt humiliated by the defeat of Jeffries.

Blacks, on the other hand, were jubilant, and celebrated Johnson's great victory as a victory for racial advancement. Black poet William Waring Cuney later highlighted the black reaction to the fight in his poem "My Lord, What a Morning".

Race riots erupted in New York, Baltimore, Pittsburgh, Philadelphia, New Orleans, Atlanta, St. Louis, Little Rock and Houston. In all, riots occurred in more than 25 states and 50 cities. At least 20 people were killed across the US from the riots, and hundreds more were injured.

Film of the bout
The Johnson–Jeffries Fight film, released the year of the fight, received more public attention in the United States than any other film to date and for the next five years, until the 1915 release of The Birth of a Nation. In the United States, many states and cities banned the exhibition of the Johnson–Jeffries film. The movement to censor Johnson's victory took over the country within three days after the fight.

Two weeks after the match former President Theodore Roosevelt, an avid boxer and fan, wrote an article for The Outlook in which he supported banning not just moving pictures of boxing matches, but a complete ban on all prize fights in the US. He cited the "crookedness" and gambling that surrounded such contests and that moving pictures have "introduced a new method of money getting and of demoralization". The controversy surrounding the film directly motivated Congress to ban distribution of all prize-fight films across state lines in 1912; the ban was lifted in 1940.

In 2005, the film of the Jeffries–Johnson "Fight of the Century" was entered into the United States National Film Registry as being worthy of preservation.

Legacy in media
 The Great White Hope (1967 play)
 The Great White Hope (1970 film)

See also
 Joe Frazier vs. Muhammad Ali

References

Bibliography
 
 
 
 
 Jack Johnson vs. James Jeffries: Topics in Chronicling America, Library of Congress

1910 in boxing
1910s in sports in Nevada
Boxing in Reno
Boxing matches
Politics and race in the United States